Elizabeth Odio Benito (born 15 September 1939) is a lawyer and politician from Costa Rica. She served as President in the Inter-American Court of Human Rights from 2018 to 2020. She was a Vice-President of the International Criminal Court. She previously served as a judge on the International Criminal Tribunal for the Former Yugoslavia, and in her home country of Costa Rica was twice appointed Justice Minister, later becoming Vice-President of the Republic. Her background is as an academic lawyer, specialising in the administration of justice and human rights, in particular the rights of women.

Early life and education
Although born in Puntarenas, the first child of Emiliano Odio Madrigal and Esperanza Benito Ibañez, most of her early life was spent in San José, where she attended the Colegio Superior de Señoritas. The law was something of a tradition on her father's side of the family; Odio Benito was particularly encouraged by her lawyer uncle, Ulises Odio Santos, to study that subject. She graduated with a master's degree from the University of Costa Rica in 1964, where she remained for much of her academic career, rising to a full professorship in 1986 and Vice-President for Academic Affairs in 1988. During this period, she began to work in the field of gender studies, with an emphasis on crimes committed against women.

Political career in Costa Rica
From 1976 to 1978 she served as Secretary to the Colegio de Abogados, the bar association of Costa Rica, and in 1978 was appointed to the joint
offices of Minister of Justice and Attorney General, which she held until 1982 when the National Liberation Party took the presidency. In 1990 she returned for another four-year term as Minister of Justice, under President Rafael Ángel Calderón Fournier. The peak of her domestic political career came in 1998, with her election as Second Vice-President alongside President Miguel Ángel Rodríguez and First Vice-President Astrid Fischel Volio; during this time she was also Minister for the Environment and Energy.

Career in International Law

Judge of the International Criminal Tribunal for the former Yugoslavia, 1993–1998
Odio Benito's involvement in international justice began during her second ministerial term, with her 1993 appointment as a judge on the International Criminal Tribunal for the former Yugoslavia. This was the first time she had sat as a judge, a fact for which she has been criticised by some of the tribunal participants. A major contribution during these proceedings was Odio Benito's successful effort to have rape and other sexual assaults considered as torture. Her interpretation, based on a case of two Serbian women raped in the Čelebići detention camp, is now an accepted principle of international law.

In 1998 Odio Benito left ICTY as a consequence of becoming Vice-President, but she continued to play an active role in related areas of the law. Most notably, she was president of the United Nations working group that drew up the Optional Protocol to the Convention against Torture.  This additional treaty, open to any State that is party to the main UN Convention Against Torture anti-torture Convention, allows for international and independent national experts to visit any prison, detention camp, or similar facility, speak in private with people held there, and make recommendations to authorities aimed at preventing torture or other abuse from being practiced there. The Optional Protocol entered into force on 22 June 2006. As of 31 January 2007 it had 32 State Parties with a further 31 States have signed but not yet ratified the Protocol.

Judge of the International Criminal Court, 2003–2012
Odio Benito's election to the International Criminal Court was not without controversy. Her candidacy had initially been sponsored by Costa Rica, but President Abel Pacheco withdrew support without explanation. Various women's groups mobilised to campaign for her readmittance. She was eventually renominated by Panama, whose then president, Mireya Moscoso, is another noted activist for women's rights. Odio Benito was thus the only candidate not to be sponsored by her own nation. Nevertheless, she was elected in the first out of thirty-three rounds of voting, indicating strong support from the States Parties.

The ICC officially opened on 11 March 2003, with Elizabeth Odio Benito as Second Vice-President.

When the International Criminal Court sentenced Congolese warlord Thomas Lubanga to 14 years in prison in July 2012 for using child soldiers in his rebel army in 2002 and 2003 – the first sentence imposed by the court in its history –, Odio Benito disagreed with her two fellow judges and in a dissenting opinion said that 15 years would have been more appropriate given the harm done to the victims and their families, particularly due to harsh punishments and sexual violence against the UPC's child soldiers.

Judge of the Interamerican Court of Human Rights 
Odio Benito served as a judge of the Interamerican Court of Human Rights from 2016 to 2020.  She served as President in the Inter-American Court of Human Rights from 2018 to 2020. She was the second woman to hold this position.

Lectures
Los crimenes de violencia sexual en el derecho internacional penal de los siglos XX y XXI (El nuevo orden jurídico internacional a partir de 1945 y su ausencia de perspectiva de genero) in the Lecture Series of the United Nations Audiovisual Library of International Law

Awards
Odio was inducted into La Galería de las Mujeres de Costa Rica (The Costa Rican Gallery of Women) in 2002 for her contributions to human rights.

References

External links
 https://web.archive.org/web/20070606205304/http://www.icc-cpi.int/presidency/secondvice.html – ICC biography
 https://web.archive.org/web/20050118192140/http://www.icc-cpi.int/library/organs/presidency/curriculumvitae_odio_benito.pdf – Curriculum vitae supporting ICC candidacy
 http://www.abogados.or.cr/revista_elforo/foro3 – Issue of the Colegio de Abogados magazine with several articles on Odio Benito (Spanish)
 http://www.un.org/law/icc/elections/results/judges_results.htm – ICC election results

1939 births
Living people
People from Puntarenas
Vice presidents of Costa Rica
International Criminal Court judges
International criminal law scholars
20th-century Costa Rican judges
Costa Rican women judges
International Criminal Tribunal for the former Yugoslavia judges
21st-century Costa Rican judges
Justice ministers of Costa Rica
Costa Rican women lawyers
Women government ministers of Costa Rica
Women vice presidents
Costa Rican judges of United Nations courts and tribunals
Costa Rican judges of international courts and tribunals
Female justice ministers
20th-century women judges
21st-century women judges
20th-century Costa Rican women politicians
21st-century Costa Rican women politicians